"Born to Be with You" is a song by the American female vocal quartet The Chordettes. Written by Don Robertson, the song was released in 1956. The song reached a position of number five on the pop charts in the United States. In Ireland, Butch Moore & The Capitol Showband took it to No. 1 in 1965.

Background
In the Chordettes version, because of the short verses, the Chordettes hum two choruses in-between the verses, while in the second humming chorus, a whistling of composer Don Robertson, is heard playing a counterpoint melody. Several disc jockeys wrongly fade the song out when the bass guitar plays a rumba rhythm that seems to fade out, however, following a brief pause, the Chordettes sing a harmonic variation Capella of the word "AMEN".

Cover versions
Don Robertson also recorded this song in 1965. 
In 1968, Sonny James recorded a version of the song which reached number one on the country charts.
J.D. Crowe recorded the song on his 1978 release Blackjack. It is a bluegrass rendition.
Bing Crosby recorded the song in 1956 for use on his radio show and it was subsequently included in the box set The Bing Crosby CBS Radio Recordings (1954-56) issued by Mosaic Records (catalog MD7-245) in 2009.
In 1973, Dave Edmunds had a No. 5 hit in the UK with the song, using his then popular "wall of sound" technique, borrowed from Phil Spector.
 Dion DiMucci recorded the song as the title song of his 1975 Born to Be with You album, the song and much of the album being produced by Phil Spector.
Steel-string acoustic guitarist Leo Kottke included his rendition of the song on his 1974 album, Ice Water.
Country singer Sandy Posey released the song in 1978 and it went to No. 21 on the US country chart.

References

1956 songs
1956 singles
1968 singles
Songs written by Don Robertson (songwriter)
The Chordettes songs
Sonny James songs
Anne Murray songs
Cadence Records singles
Dave Edmunds songs